Shahr-e Viran (also Romanized as Shahr-e Vīrān; also known as Shahr-e Vīnān) is a village in Targavar Rural District, Silvaneh District, Urmia County, West Azerbaijan Province, Iran. At the 2006 census, its population was 19, in 4 families.

References 

Populated places in Urmia County